Safwan Hill (or Jabal Sanam) is located in Basra Governorate, southern Iraq.

Iraq War 2003
On 19 March 2003 the United States Marine Corps 3rd Marine Air Wing attacked the Iraqi Army observation post on Safwan Hill.

References

External links
 Al-Naqib, K. M. "Geology of Jabal Sanam, south of Iraq." Journal of the Geological Society of Iraq 3 (1970): 9-36.

Mountains of Iraq
Basra Governorate